The Rolls-Royce Silver Dawn is a full-size luxury car that was produced by Rolls-Royce at their Crewe works between 1949 and 1955. It was the first Rolls-Royce car to be offered with a factory built body which it shared, along with its chassis, with the Bentley Mark VI until 1952 and then the Bentley R Type until production finished in 1955. The car was first introduced as an export only model. The left hand drive manual transmission models had a column gear change, while right hand drives had a floor change by the door.  officially available on the home market, from October 1953. 

In 1944 W. A. Robotham saw that there would be limited postwar demand for Rolls-Royce or Bentley  chassis with a body from a specialist coachbuilder, and negotiated with the Pressed Steel Company a contract for a general-purpose body to carry four people in comfort on their postwar rolling chassis, fitted as always with a distinct Rolls-Royce or Bentley radiator. Though he stretched the demand to 2000 per year, Pressed Steel were "nonplussed" by the small demand.

A mere 760 were produced between 1949 and 1955. Silver Dawn Series A-D had bodywork identical to the Mark VI. In 1953, with the "E" series (Chassis Number SKE2), the Silver Dawn body was modified in parallel to the Bentley Mk VI body and a large boot was added.  While the Bentley Mk VI was renamed the Bentley R after this change, the Rolls-Royce Silver Dawn kept its name. Even with mass produced Standard Steel bodies, all panels forward of the bulkhead/firewall were slightly different for the Rolls-Royce than those fitted to the Bentley.

In 1951 the Silver Dawn was upgraded to the 4 1/2 L engine and the full flow oil filter (Chassis Number LSFC2). In 1953 the high compression cylinder head was fitted from Chassis number SMF66 and from the same chassis number on the Bentley Mk VI type camshaft was fitted to left hand drive vehicles. Earlier models up to circa May 1954 had a different fascia from the Bentley Mk.VI and 'R' Type, and were fitted with a single exhaust system. Later models from the SRH2 chassis series had the Bentley style fascia and the twin exhaust system, as fitted to the Bentley 'R' Type.

The carburettor up to Chassis number SFC100 was a single double downdraught Stromberg type AAV 26 until 1952 when it was replaced by a Zenith DBVC42.

A 4-speed manual gearbox was fitted to all cars at first, with a 4-speed automatic becoming an option in late 1952 on the 'E' Series chassis, and on the corresponding Bentley 'R' Type chassis. There are conflicting reports if the automatic gearbox became standard in the Silver Dawn, but both manual and automatic options were available until the end of the production run. However the original invoice for a 1955 UK model (Chassis Number SVJ115) clearly shows that the Automatic Gearbox was an optional extra and cost the buyer £70.0.0.
 
The suspension was independent at the front using coil springs while at the rear the live axle used half elliptic leaf springs. The car had a separate chassis made with traditional riveted construction until 1953 after which it was welded. Servo assisted  drum brakes were used, hydraulically operated at the front but retaining mechanical operation at the rear. Although many cars were fitted with factory built bodies, others were supplied to external coachbuilders.

Performance
The test car cost £4704 including taxes.

References

Silver Dawn
1950s cars
Rear-wheel-drive vehicles
Full-size vehicles
Luxury vehicles
Sedans
Cars introduced in 1949